Forontoniana was a Roman town of the Roman province of Byzacena during late antiquity. The town has tentatively been identified with the ruins at Henchir-Bir-El-Menadla in modern Tunisia.

Forontoniana was also the seat of an ancient episcopal see of the Roman Catholic Church. The only known bishop of this diocese was Felix, who took part in the synod in Carthage in 484 called by the Vandal king Huneric, after which Felix was exiled. Today Forontoniana survives as a titular bishopric though  the seat is currently vacant.

Known Bishops
Felix  (mentioned in 484) 
Luigi Poggi (1965–1994) 
Pierfranco Shepherd (1994–2015)

References

Catholic titular sees in Africa
Archaeological sites in Tunisia
Roman towns and cities in Tunisia